Louis Martin Schettler  (June 12, 1886 – May 1, 1960) was a pitcher in Major League Baseball. He pitched for the 1910 Philadelphia Phillies.

External links

1886 births
1960 deaths
Baseball players from Pittsburgh
Brookhaven (minor league baseball) players
Dayton Veterans players
Erie Sailors players
Flint Vehicles players
Lancaster Red Roses players
Major League Baseball pitchers
Natchez Indians players
Peoria Distillers players
Peterborough Petes (baseball) players
Philadelphia Phillies players
South Bend Benders players
Terre Haute Highlanders players
Uniontown Coal Barons players
Youngstown Champs players
Youngstown Indians players
Youngstown Ohio Works players
Youngstown Steelmen players